William Lawes (April 160224 September 1645) was an English composer and musician.

Life and career
Lawes was born in Salisbury, Wiltshire and was baptised on 1 May 1602.  He was the son of Thomas Lawes, a vicar choral at Salisbury Cathedral, and brother to Henry Lawes, a very successful composer in his own right. It is possible the young William was a member of the cathedral choir there.

His patron, Edward Seymour, Earl of Hertford, apprenticed him to the composer John Coprario, which probably brought Lawes into contact with Charles, Prince of Wales at an early age. Both William and his elder brother Henry received court appointments after Charles succeeded to the British throne as Charles I. William was appointed as "musician in ordinary for lutes and voices" in 1635 but had been writing music for the court prior to this.

Lawes spent all his adult life in Charles's employ. He composed secular music and songs for court masques (and doubtless played in them), as well as sacred anthems and motets for Charles's private worship. He is most remembered today for his sublime viol consort suites for between three and six players and his lyra viol music. His use of counterpoint and fugue and his tendency to juxtapose bizarre, spine-tingling themes next to pastoral ones in these works made them disfavoured in the centuries after his death; they have only become widely available in recent years.

When Charles's dispute with Parliament led to the outbreak of the Civil War, Lawes joined the Royalist army. During the Siege of York, Lawes was living in the city and wrote at least one piece of music as a direct result of the military situation – the round See how Cawood's dragon looks, a vivid and defiant response to the Parliamentarian capture of Cawood Castle, about ten miles from York. 
He was given a post in the King's Life Guards, which was intended to keep him out of danger. Despite this, he was "casually shot" by a Parliamentarian in the rout of the Royalists at Rowton Heath, near Chester, on 24 September 1645.
Although the King was in mourning for his kinsman Bernard Stuart (killed in the same defeat), he instituted a special mourning for Lawes, apparently honouring him with the title of "Father of Musick."
The author of his epitaph, Thomas Jordan, closed it with a lachrymose pun on the fact that Lawes had died at the hands of those who denied the divine right of kings:

Lawes' body was lost or destroyed and his burial site is unknown.

Musical style
Lawes' instrumental music is typical of the 17th-century genre in England. Intense rhythmical gestures and dissonant harmonies stand in stark contrast with the traditional rules of counterpoint such as practiced by previous composers which were known to Lawes, like William Byrd. His writing style is highly mannered, oft experimental and virtuosic; melodies may be fragmented and altered with varied articulation and accentuation. Lawes was known to be a virtuoso on the lyra viol. There as well his music features chromatic extremes which are not normally encountered in works of the early Baroque. Nevertheless, his works, including two compositions on the cantus firmus In nomine, show that he was aware of the theoretical practices of his day. 

He is particularly known for his ensemble dance music, which takes the form of suites called "consort sets," well appreciated by his contemporaries and successors. Ten of these sets form a fine and varied collection called the Royal Consort, completed in 1635 for Charles I of England. This was issued in two versions: for two treble viols, tenor viol, bass viol and theorbo continuo; and, later, for two violins, two bass viols and two theorbos. Until recently the violin version was the better known, thanks to editing work done in the 1960s, but scholarship has revealed the four-viol version to be of much better quality, having been the original setting. Many of Lawes' consort sets seem to have been composed as functional music or pedagogical pieces.

Works

for Voice
Dainty Fine Aniseed Water Fine, ca. 1630
Drink Tonight of the Moonshine Bright, ca. 1630
Gather Your Rosebuds While You May, ca. 1630
She Weepeth Sore In the Night, ca. 1630

for Solo instrument
Music for Solo Lyra-Viol, ca. 1630

for Instrumental ensemble
Note that the Royal Consort sets below exist in a primary scoring of 2 Treble Viols, Tenor Viol, Bass Viol and Theorbo (as thorough-bass, or continuo) as well as in an alternative, but recently discredited, scoring of 2 Treble Viols, 2 Bass Viols and 2 Theorbos (with the option of violins replacing the treble viols). Sources with the two-theorbo scoring show extra movements, notably a Fantasy and an Ecco each to open and close Sets 1 and 6, and adjustments to the sequence of movements.
Almain for 2 Lutes, ca. 1625
Almain for 3 Lyra-Viols, vdgs564, ca. 1630
Almain for 4 Viols and Continuo, vdgs260, 1625
Courante 1 for 2 Lutes, ca. 1625
Courante 2 for 2 Lutes, ca. 1625
Divisions on a Pavan in g for 2 Bass Viols and Organ, ca. 1638
Eight Sonatas (Fantasy Suites) for Violin, Bass Viol and Organ, ca. 1630
Eight Sonatas (Fantasy Suites) for 2 Violins, Bass Viol and Organ, ca. 1630
Fantasy for 3 Lyra-Viols, vdgs567, ca. 1630
Fantasy in c for 4 Viols, vdgs108, ca. 1630
Organ Consort Set 1 (Fantasy—Air—Air) a 5 in g, On the Playnsong, ca. 1638
Organ Consort Set 2 (Fantasy—Fantasy—Air) a 5 in a, For Ye Violls, ca. 1638
Organ Consort Set 3 (Fantasy—Air—Pavan—Air) a 5 in c, ca. 1638
Organ Consort Set 4 (Fantasy—Pavan—Air) a 5 in F, ca. 1638
Organ Consort Set 5 (Fantasy—Pavan—Air) a 5 in C, ca. 1638
Organ Consort Set 6 (Pavan—Fantasy—Air) a 6 in g, ca. 1638
Organ Consort Set 7 (Fantasy—Fantasy—Air) a 6 in C, ca. 1638
Organ Consort Set 8 (Air—Fantasy—Air—Fantasy) a 6 in F, Sunrise, ca. 1638
Organ Consort Set 9 (Fantasy—Air—In nomine) a 6 in Bb, ca. 1638
Organ Consort Set 10 (Fantasy—Fantasy—In nomine—Air) a 6 in c, ca. 1638
Pavan for 4 Viols and Continuo, vdgs76, 1625
Royal Consort Set 1 in d for 4 Viols and Continuo, 1635
Royal Consort Set 2 in d for 4 Viols and Continuo, 1635
Royal Consort Set 3 in d for 4 Viols and Continuo, 1635
Royal Consort Set 4 in D for 4 Viols and Continuo, 1635
Royal Consort Set 5 in D for 4 Viols and Continuo, 1635
Royal Consort Set 6 in D for 4 Viols and Continuo, 1635
Royal Consort Set 7 in a for 4 Viols and Continuo, 1635
Royal Consort Set 8 in C for 4 Viols and Continuo, 1635
Royal Consort Set 9 in F for 4 Viols and Continuo, 1635
Royal Consort Set 10 in Bb for 4 Viols and Continuo, 1635
Sarabande for 3 Lyra-Viols, vdgs569, ca. 1630
Sarabande for 4 Viols and Continuo, vdgs264, 1625
Set a 4 in g, ca. 1630

for the Church
30 3-part Psalm settings

for the Stage
music for various masques
Ye Fiends and Furies for Davenant's masque The Unfortunate Lovers

Discography

 For ye violls: Consort setts in 5 & 6 parts
Fretwork & Paul Nicholson; Virgin Classics 91187-2; 1991
 Sonatas for violin, bass viol and organ
London Baroque; Harmonia Mundi HMA 1901493; 1994
 Fantasia Suites for two violins, bass viol and organ
The Purcell Quartet; Chandos CHAN0552, 1994
 Royall Consort Suites
The Purcell Quartet with Nigel North & Paul O'Dette; Chandos CHAN0584/5, 1995
 Consort Music for Viols, Lutes and Theorbos
the Rose Consort of Viols, Timothy Roberts, Jacob Heringman & David Miller; Naxos 8.550601; 1995
 Royall Consort Suites vol 1
The Greate Consort; Gaudeamus CD GAU146, 1995
 Concord is conquer'd: Consort setts for 5 & 6 viols. 4 Herrick songs. Pieces for lyra viol
Fretwork, Catherine Bott, Richard Boothby & Paul Nicholson; Virgin Classics 5451472; 1995
 Royall Consort Suites vol 2
The Greate Consort; CD GAU147, 1997
 The Royal Consort & lute songs
René Jacobs, Sigiswald Kuijken, Lucy van Dael, Wieland Kuijken, Toyohiko Satoh, Edward Witsenbug, Gustav Leonhardt; Sony Classical 1997
 Fantazia suites for violin, bass viol and organ
Music's Re-creation; Centaur CRC 2385; 1998
 Suites pour une et trois lyra-violes
Jonathan Dunford, Sylvia Abramowicz & Sylvia Moquet; Adès 465 607–2; 1998
 Consorts in four and five parts
Phantasm & Sarah Cunningham; Channel Classics CCS 15698; 2000
 Consorts in six parts
Phantasm, Susanne Braumann & Varpu Haavisto; Channel Classics CCS 17498; 2002
 Consort Sets in Five & Six Parts, Jordi Savall – Hespèrion XXI – Alia Vox 9823 A+B 
 Consort sets in five & six parts,
Hespèrion XXI, Alia Vox AV9823A, AV9823B; 2002
 Knock'd on the head: William Lawes, music for viols
Concordia, Metronome MET CD 1045; 2002
 William Lawes: In loving memory. Musica Oscura 070972-2
 Harp Consorts
 Maxine Eilander et Les Voix Humaines; ATMA Classique ACD22372; 2008
 The Royall Consorts
Les Voix Humaines; ATMA Classique ACD22373; 2012
 The Royal Consort
Phantasm & Laurence Dreyfus; Linn CKD470; 2015
 Royal Consorts: Music for English Kings
Latitude 37; ABC Classics 4812100; 2015

Further reading
 Cunningham, J., The Consort Music of William Lawes, 1602–1645, Boydell & Brewer, 2010
 Lefkowitz, M., William Lawes, Routledge and Kegan Paul, 1960

See also 
 Drexel 4041

Notes

References
 D. Pinto, For ye violls: The consort and dance music of William Lawes Fretwork 1995; 
 Sleeve notes of the items listed in the discography.
 Extract of Murray Lefkowitz's 1960 biography of Lawes 
 
  (subscription require)

External links
 
 
 WILLIAM LAWES, Goldberg, Composers
 Lawes, William at oxforddnb.com (requires login)

1602 births
1645 deaths
People from Salisbury
English Baroque composers
English classical composers
English viol players
Cavaliers
English military personnel killed in action
People killed in the English Civil War
17th-century classical composers
17th-century English composers
English male classical composers